J prince may refer to:

People
 J Prince, Gospel Soca Artiste from Trinidad and Tobago
 James Prince, CEO of Houston-based Rap-a-Lot Records